Leucanopsis potamia is a moth of the family Erebidae. It was described by William Schaus in 1941. It is found in Colombia.

References

potamia
Moths described in 1941